The Temple Owls football program from 1900 to 1909 was led by five head coaches: John T. Rogers was the head coach from 1899 to 1900 and compiled a 4–8–2 record; Harry Shindle Wingert was the head coach from 1901 to 1905, compiling a 12–9–2 record; Horace Butterworth was the head coach in 1907 and compiled a 4–0–2 record; Frank W. White was the head coach in 1908 and compiled a 3–2–1 record; and William J. Schatz was the head coach from 1909 to 1913 and compiled a 13–13–3 record.

1900

The 1900 Temple Owls football team was an American football team that represented Temple University as an independent during the 1900 college football season. In its second and final season under head coach John T. Rogers, the team compiled a 3–4–1 record.

Schedule

1901

The 1901 Temple Owls football team was an American football team that represented Temple University as an independent during the 1901 college football season. In its second season under head coach Harry Shindle Wingert, the team compiled a 3–2 record.

Schedule

1902

The 1902 Temple Owls football team was an American football team that represented Temple University as an independent during the 1902 college football season. In its second season under head coach Harry Shindle Wingert, the team compiled a 1–4–1 record.

Schedule

1903

The 1903 Temple Owls football team was an American football team that represented Temple University as an independent during the 1913 college football season. In its third season under head coach Harry Shindle Wingert, the team compiled a 4–1 record.

Schedule

1904

The 1904 Temple Owls football team was an American football team that represented Temple University as an independent during the 1904 college football season. In its fourth season under Harry Shindle Wingert, the team compiled a 2–2 record.

Schedule

1905

The 1905 Temple Owls football team was an American football team that represented Temple University as an independent during the 1905 college football season. In its fifth and final season under head coach Harry Shindle Wingert, the team compiled a 2–0–1 record.

Schedule

1906
No team fielded.

1907

The 1907 Temple Owls football team was an American football team that represented Temple University as an independent during the 1907 college football season. In its first and only season under head coach Horace Butterworth, the team compiled a 4–0–2 record.

Schedule

1908

The 1908 Temple Owls football team was an American football team that represented Temple University as an independent during the 1908 college football season. In its first and only season under head coach Frank W. White, the team compiled a 3–2–1 record.

The season included the first meeting in the Temple–Villanova football rivalry; Villanova won the game by a 12–0 score.

Schedule

1909

The 1909 Temple Owls football team was an American football team that represented Temple University as an independent during the 1909 college football season. In its first under head coach William J. Schatz, the team compiled a 0–4–1 record.

Schedule

References

1900
Temple
Temple
Temple
Temple
Temple
Temple
Temple
Temple
Temple